The men's long jump at the 2012 European Athletics Championships was held at the Helsinki Olympic Stadium on 29 June and 1 July.

Medalists

Records

Schedule

Results

Qualification
Qualification: Qualification Performance 8.05 (Q) or at least 12 best performers advance to the final

Final

References

Qualification Results
Final Results

Long jump
Long jump at the European Athletics Championships